A decagonal number is a figurate number that extends the concept of triangular and square numbers to the decagon (a ten-sided polygon). However, unlike the triangular and square numbers, the patterns involved in the construction of decagonal numbers are not rotationally symmetrical. Specifically, the  nth decagonal numbers counts the number of dots in a pattern of n nested decagons, all sharing a common corner, where the ith decagon in the pattern has sides made of i dots spaced one unit apart from each other. The n-th decagonal number is given by the following formula
 
The first few decagonal numbers are:
 0, 1, 10, 27, 52, 85, 126, 175, 232, 297, 370, 451, 540, 637, 742, 855, 976, 1105, 1242, 1387, 1540, 1701, 1870, 2047, 2232, 2425, 2626, 2835, 3052, 3277, 3510, 3751, 4000, 4257, 4522, 4795, 5076, 5365, 5662, 5967, 6280, 6601, 6930, 7267, 7612, 7965, 8326 

The nth decagonal number can also be calculated by adding the square of n to thrice the (n−1)th pronic number or, to put it algebraically, as

Properties 

 Decagonal numbers consistently alternate parity.
  is the sum of the first  natural numbers congruent to 1 mod 8.
 The only decagonal numbers that are square numbers are 0 and 1.
 The decagonal numbers follow the following recurrence relations:

Figurate numbers